Lorenzo Pérez de Grado (died 1627) was a Roman Catholic prelate who served as Bishop of Cuzco (1619–1627) and Bishop of Paraguay (1615–1619).

Biography
On 16 September 1615, Lorenzo Pérez de Grado was appointed during the papacy of Pope Paul V as Bishop of Paraguay.
In 1616, he was consecrated bishop by Agustín de Carvajal, Bishop of Ayacucho o Huamanga.
On 18 March 1619, he was appointed during the papacy of Pope Paul V as Bishop of Cuzco.
He served as Bishop of Cuzco until his death on 4 September 1627.

While bishop, he was the principal consecrator of Julián de Cortázar, Bishop of Córdoba (1618).

References

External links and additional sources
 (for Chronology of Bishops) 
 (for Chronology of Bishops)  
 (for Chronology of Bishops) 
 (for Chronology of Bishops) 

17th-century Roman Catholic bishops in Peru
Bishops appointed by Pope Paul V
1627 deaths
17th-century Roman Catholic bishops in Paraguay
Roman Catholic bishops of Paraguay
Roman Catholic bishops of Cusco